Luca Braidot (born 29 May 1991) is an Italian professional mountain bike and cyclo-cross cyclist. He rode at the cross-country event at the 2016 Summer Olympics, where he finished 7th. At the 2018 European Mountain Bike Championships, he finished 2nd in the cross-country event.

His twin brother Daniele is also a professional cyclist.

Major results

Cyclo-cross

2007–2008
 2nd Ciclocross del Ponte Juniors
 2nd GP Città di Verbania Juniors
2008–2009
 2nd Ciclocross del Ponte Juniors
 2nd GP Città San Martino Juniors
 6th UCI Junior World Championships
2010–2011
 2nd National Under-23 Championships
2011–2012
 3rd National Under-23 Championships
2014–2015
 3rd National Championships
2016–2017
 2nd Trofeo di Gorizia
 2nd Gran Premio Città di Vittorio Veneto
 2nd Trof.Cop.ed.Brugherio82
 3rd National Championships
2017–2018
 1st  National Championships
2018–2019
 2nd National Championships
 3rd Ciclocross del Ponte

Mountain Bike

2012
 1st  Team relay, UCI World Championships
 UEC European Championships
1st  Team relay
3rd  Under-23 Cross-country
2014
 1st  Cross-country, National Championships
2018
 UEC European Championships
1st  Team relay
2nd  Cross-country
2019
 2nd  Team relay, UEC European Championships
2021
 1st  Team relay, UEC European Championships
2022
 3rd Overall UCI XCO World Cup
1st Lenzerheide
1st Vallnord
3rd Snowshoe
 Internazionali d'Italia Series
1st Capoliveri
1st La Thuile
2nd San Zeno di Montagna
 UCI World Championships
2nd  Team relay
3rd  Cross-country
 3rd Cross-country, National Championships
 UCI XCC World Cup
3rd Snowshoe
3rd Val di Sole

References

External links

1991 births
Living people
Italian male cyclists
Cyclists at the 2016 Summer Olympics
Olympic cyclists of Italy
Italian mountain bikers
Cyclists at the 2020 Summer Olympics
Cyclo-cross cyclists
People from Gorizia
Cyclists from Friuli Venezia Giulia